Olli Miettinen (1 September 1869 – 28 September 1946) was a Finnish farmer and politician, born in Tuusniemi. He was a Member of the Parliament of Finland from 1910 to 1913, representing the Social Democratic Party of Finland (SDP).

References

1869 births
1946 deaths
People from Tuusniemi
People from Kuopio Province (Grand Duchy of Finland)
Social Democratic Party of Finland politicians
Members of the Parliament of Finland (1910–11)
Members of the Parliament of Finland (1911–13)